Filip Sasínek (born 8 January 1996) is a Czech middle-distance runner. He won the bronze medal in the 1500 metres at the 2017 European Indoor Championships.

International competitions

Personal bests
Outdoor
400 metres – 48.98 (Hodonín 2018)
600 metres – 1:19.57 (Bratislava 2014)
800 metres – 1:46.24 (Göteborg 2020)
1000 metres – 2:19.03 (Ostrava 2017)
1500 metres – 3:35.02 (Ostrava 2020)
One mile – 3:59.02 (Ostrava 2019)
3000 metres – 8:38.39 (Breclav 2014)
5000 metres – 13:58.92 (Opava 2020)
Indoor
800 metres – 1:47.75 (Ostrava 2019)
1000 metres – 2:19.62 (Pague 2021)
1500 metres – 3:36.53 (Toruń 2021) NR
One mile – 4:00.07 (Athlone 2016) NR
3000 metres – 8:13.22 (Prague 2017)

References

All-Athletics profile

1996 births
Living people
Czech male middle-distance runners
People from Hodonín
Athletes (track and field) at the 2019 European Games
European Games medalists in athletics
European Games silver medalists for the Czech Republic
Sportspeople from the South Moravian Region